There are several extant statues of the king: in Golden Square, Soho, London; at Royal Square, St. Helier, Jersey; and at the Royal Naval College, Greenwich, London.

On screen, King George II of Great Britain has been portrayed by:
 Alexander Ekert in the 1921 German silent film Exzellenz Unterrock, based on a novel by Adolf Paul
 Olaf Hytten in the 1936 film The Last of the Mohicans
 Martin Miller in the 1948 film Bonnie Prince Charlie
 Ivan Triesault in the 1951 film Dick Turpin's Ride
 Arthur Young in the 1954 biopic John Wesley
 Mathias Wieman in the 1957 film Robinson soll nicht sterben (The Girl and the Legend)
 Richard Harris in the 1989 film King of the Wind
 Clive Swift in the 1999 BBC TV drama series Aristocrats
 Richard Griffiths in the 2011 adventure film Pirates of the Caribbean: On Stranger Tides

George II
George II of Great Britain